Standings and results for Group 3 of the UEFA Euro 2000 qualifying tournament.

Standings

Matches

Goalscorers

References

Group 3
1998–99 in Northern Ireland association football
1999–2000 in Northern Ireland association football
1998–99 in German football
Qual
1998–99 in Moldovan football
1999–2000 in Moldovan football
1998–99 in Turkish football
1999–2000 in Turkish football
Turkey at UEFA Euro 2000
1998 in Finnish football
1999 in Finnish football